Rudolf Bibl (4 May 1929 – 27 January 2017) was an Austrian conductor and pianist.

Life 
Born in Vienna, parallel to attending a Gymnasium, Bibl studied piano, clarinet, composition at the Wiener Musikakademie and attended the conducting class of Hans Swarowsky. From 1948, he was répétiteur at the Graz Opera. From 1960, he worked at the Vienna Raimundtheater and the Theater an der Wien. From 1969 to 1973, he was music director in Trier, from where he gave guest performances in France and Luxembourg.

From 1973, he was conductor at the Volksoper Wien, where he conducted over 2,200 performances, including Der Vogelhändler, Die lustige Witwe, Die Csárdásfürstin and Die Fledermaus.

Guest performances and concert tours abroad took him to Japan, Italy, Germany and France, for example, to the Berlin State Opera and the Opéra Bastille in Paris. At the Vienna State Opera, he conducted Die Fledermaus and Die lustige Witwe from 1999 to 2003.

Bibl remained closely associated with the Vienna Volksoper until the end. In May 2016, he conducted three performances of Kálmán's Die Csárdásfürstin as part of a guest performance in Tokyo, his last conducting was a performance of Die Fledermaus on 1 January 2017. According to the house, he conducted 2273 performances at the Vienna Volksoper.

Bibl died at the age of 87, in Frontignan, France.

Bibl was the grandson of the composer and organist of the same name (1832–1902) and nephew of the historian Viktor Bibl.

Awards 
 1988: Österreichisches Ehrenkreuz für Wissenschaft und Kunst I. Klasse.
 1991: Honorary member of the Wiener Volksoper.
 1999: Decoration of Honour for Services to the Republic of Austria.
 2004: Great .
 2013: Honorary member of the Seefestspiele Mörbisch.

References

Further reading 
 Elisabeth Th. Hilscher-Fritz: Bibl, Familie. In ''Oesterreichisches Musiklexikon. Online edition, Vienna 2002 ff., ; Print edition: Vol 1, Österreichischen Akademie der Wissenschaften press, Vienna 2002, .

External links 
 
 
 
 
 Rudolf Bibl on Operabase
 Nachruf auf Rudolf Bibl Volksoper Wien

Austrian conductors (music)
Austrian classical pianists
Male classical pianists
Recipients of the Austrian Cross of Honour for Science and Art, 1st class
1929 births
2017 deaths
Musicians from Vienna